SMV was a bass guitar supergroup formed in 2008.  The group's name comes from the first initials of each of its members, Stanley Clarke, Marcus Miller, and Victor Wooten.

The collaboration gained momentum when the three first played together at a concert held by Bass Player magazine in New York City in 2006, where Miller and Wooten joined on stage to present Clarke with the magazine's Lifetime Achievement Award.

SMV's debut album, Thunder, was released on August 12, 2008, with a supporting world tour beginning the same month.

References

External links
 Official Website of Stanley Clarke
 Official Website of Marcus Miller
 Official Website of Victor Wooten

American jazz ensembles
Heads Up International artists
Jazz supergroups
Musical groups established in 2008